One is the debut studio album by Seattle hip hop collective Oldominion. It was released in 2001 on Under The Needle Recordings.

Reception 
The album received generally favorable reviews, with Rick Anderson of AllMusic saying "Highly recommended to all fans of progressive hip-hop." The Stranger also said "One is a masterpiece of local hip hop", and "a masterpiece of underground hip hop."

Music 
Oldominion, being a large collective with over twenty members, tends to have projects with not all members on it, such as One. The group's emcees included on One include Anaxagorus, Bishop I, Destro, JFK aka Ninjaface, L'Swhere, Mako, Nyqwil, Onry Ozzborn, Pale Soul, Rochester A.P., Sleep, Smoke M2D6, Snafu and Syndel. The production is handled by Andy B, Mako, Onry Ozzborn, Pale Soul and Snafu.

Track listing

References

External links 
 One at Discogs

2001 debut albums
Oldominion albums